Harry E. Northup (born September 2, 1940) is an American actor and poet. As an actor, he made frequent appearances in the films of Martin Scorsese and Jonathan Demme.

Personal life and career
Northup was born in Amarillo, Texas. He lived in 17 places by age 17, but mostly in Sidney, Nebraska, where he graduated from high school in 1958. From 1958 to 1961 he served in the United States Navy, where he attained the rank of Second Class Radioman.  From 1963 to 1968, he studied Method acting with Frank Corsaro in New York City.

Northup received his B.A. in English from California State University, Northridge, where he studied poetry with Ann Stanford. He has made a living as an actor for over 30 years and has been in 37 films, including Martin Scorsese's first six feature films: Who's That Knocking at My Door, Boxcar Bertha, Mean Streets, Alice Doesn't Live Here Anymore, Taxi Driver and New York, New York. He was Mr. Bimmel in Jonathan Demme's film The Silence of the Lambs and starred in Over the Edge and Fighting Mad.

Northup has been a member of the Academy of Motion Picture Arts and Sciences since 1976. His second wife, poet and novelist Holly Prado, died on June 14, 2019.  He has a son, Dylan, by his first marriage. Poets such as Walt Whitman, Leland Hickman, Paul Blackburn, Ann Stanford, William Carlos Williams, and Holly Prado have influenced Northup's poetry. He conceived and coordinated the weekly poetry reading series "Poetry on Melrose" at Gasoline Alley in Los Angeles, from 1986 to 1988. Poets who read at the venue include Robert Peters, Jack Hirschman and Lewis MacAdams.

Awards and honors
The City of Los Angeles, as represented by the L.A. City Council, awarded Northup a Certificate of Recognition on November 15, 2006.

Poetry
Amarillo Born, Victor Jiminez Press, 1966
The Jon Voight Poems, Mt. Averno Press, 1973
Eros Ash, Momentum Press, 1976
Enough The Great Running Chapel, Momentum Press, 1982
The Images We Possess Kill The Capturing, Jesse Press, 1988
The Ragged Vertical, Cahuenga Press, 1996
Reunions, Cahuenga Press, 2001
Greatest Hits, 1966–2001, Pudding House Press, 2002
Red Snow Fence, Cahuenga Press, 2006
Where Bodies Again Recline, Cahuenga Press, 2011
East Hollywood: Memorial To Reason, Cahuenga Press, 2015
Love Poem to MPTF, Cahuenga Press, 2020

Anthologies
 Venice Thirteen, Bayrock Press, 1971
 The Streets Inside: Ten Los Angeles Poets, Momentum Press, 1978
 Foreign Exchange, Biographics, 1979
 Poetry Loves Poetry, An Anthology of Los Angeles Poets, Momentum Press, 1985
 Gridlock: An anthology of Poetry About Southern California, Applezaba Press, 1990
 Grand Passion, The Poets of Los Angeles and Beyond, Red Wind Books, 1995
 Corners of the Mouth, A Celebration of Thirty Years at the Annual San Luis Obispo Poetry Festival, Deer Tree Press, 2014
 Wide Awake: Poets of Los Angeles and Beyond, Pacific Coast Poetry Series/Beyond Baroque Books, 2015
 Coiled Serpent, Poets Arising from the Cultural Quakes & Shifts of Los Angeles, Tia Chucha Press, 2016
 Beat Not Beat anthology, Moon Tide Press, 2022

Audio
Personal Crime, New Alliance Records, 1993
Homes,  New Alliance Records, 1995
As Long As I Tell The Truth What Difference Does It Make To You – An Interview with Harry Northup, Alright, Dude Productions, 2010

Filmography

References
<ref>

External links
 
 Harry Northup Papers MSS 598. **
 Special Collections & Archives, UC San Diego Library.
 Cahuenga Press
 Bio Sketch
 Video of Harry Northup reading at the Word Benefit Poetry Marathon, Ave. 50 Studio in Highland Park, CA – as featured on www.Poetry.LA
 Getting in character with Harry Northup:an Interview
  Over the Edge," by Mike Sachs
  extensive interview
  interview

American male poets
American male film actors
1940 births
Living people
People from Amarillo, Texas
Male actors from Texas
People from Sidney, Nebraska